Juliet Anne Prowse (September 25, 1936 – September 14, 1996) was a dancer and actress whose four-decade career included stage, television and film. She was raised in South Africa, where her family emigrated after World War II. Known for her attractive legs, she was described after her death as having "arguably the best legs since Betty Grable."

Early life

Prowse was born in Bombay, British India, to an English father and South African mother.  After her father's death when she was 3 years old, her mother returned with her to South Africa. She began studying dance a year later, at the age of four.

In her early twenties, she was dancing at a club in Paris when she was spotted by a talent agent and eventually signed to play the role of Claudine in the Walter Lang film Can-Can (1960). She had already missed a few opportunities to go to Hollywood because she was under contract but eventually left a show in Spain in which she was starring to travel to the United States for this film.

Career
It was during the filming of Can-Can in 1959 that she captured the international spotlight. Soviet leader Nikita Khrushchev visited the set of the film, and after Prowse performed a rather saucy can-can for the Russian leader, he proclaimed her dance immoral. The publicity brought Prowse considerable attention in the United States. From there, her career accelerated.

Film and television
Prowse met Frank Sinatra on the set of Can-Can. Time did not rate the movie highly, but declared Prowse the best thing in it: "In fact, the only thing really worth seeing is Juliet Prowse, a young South African hoofer who puts some twinkle in the stub-toed choreography. And the only thing really worth hearing is the crack that Frank flips back at Juliet when she whips a redoubtable hip in his direction. 'Don't point,' he gasps. 'It's rude.'" She would go on to appear with Sinatra and other notable guests such as Ella Fitzgerald, Peter Lawford, Hermione Gingold, the Hi-Lo's, Red Norvo, and Nelson Riddle and his orchestra on the 1959 Frank Sinatra Show. She at times would sing in the chorus with other guests or Sinatra would sing to her.

Sinatra invited Prowse to join him in Las Vegas, even though she was living with the actor Nico Minardos at the time. Sinatra and Prowse announced their engagement in 1962. Soon afterwards they broke up, reportedly because Prowse wanted to concentrate on her career. Prowse later admitted, "I was as much flattered as I was in love. He (Sinatra) was a complex person, and after a few drinks he could be very difficult."

Prowse co-starred alongside Elvis Presley in G.I. Blues (1960). During shooting of the film, they had a short and intense fling. "Elvis and I had an affair... We had a sexual attraction like two healthy young people, but he was already a victim of his fans. We always met in his room and never went out." Prowse also made a brief cameo appearance in the Metro-Goldwyn-Mayer documentary film, Elvis: That's the Way It Is (1970) as an interviewed audience member about to attend Elvis Presley's opening night show at the International Hotel in Las Vegas on August 10, 1970.

She starred with Denny Scott Miller on her own NBC sitcom in the 1965–1966 season: Mona McCluskey, which was produced by George Burns. The series was based on the idea that the couple, Mike and Mona McCluskey, would live on his military salary, rather than her lucrative earnings as an actress.

Prowse also did other feature films, including The Fiercest Heart (1961) and Who Killed Teddy Bear? (1965) with Sal Mineo and Elaine Stritch.

Although her film and television career did not make her as big a star as predicted, Prowse had a rather philosophical way of looking at it. "Things generally happen for the best... I never worry about what happens in my career, because I can always do something else." Prowse would later go on to headline successful Las Vegas shows, commanding a very high salary. Stating that Las Vegas was the most demanding place she ever worked, she won Entertainer of the Year for the Vegas run of Sweet Charity. She would later show off her famous dancer's legs in a series of lucrative nationwide commercials for a number of advertisers, including L'eggs hosiery and Mannington Flooring.

Prowse was a guest on the first season of The Muppet Show.

In 1987, she was mauled by the same 80-pound leopard on two occasions: the first time while filming a scene for Circus of the Stars, then later while rehearsing a promotional stunt on The Tonight Show. The latter attack was more serious, requiring upwards of twenty stitches to reattach her ear.

Throughout the mid-1980s and 1990s, Prowse hosted the Championship Ballroom Dance Competition on PBS.

Death
In 1994, Prowse was diagnosed with pancreatic cancer. In 1995, she went into remission and was well enough to tour with Mickey Rooney in Sugar Babies. The cancer subsequently returned and she died on September 14, 1996, eleven days short of her 60th birthday.

Her ex-husband, television actor John McCook, is the father of her only child, Seth.

Filmography

Film
 Gentlemen Marry Brunettes (1955) as Specialty Dancer (uncredited)
 Can-Can (1960) as Claudine
 G.I. Blues (1960) as Lili
 The Fiercest Heart (1961) as Francina
 The Right Approach (1961) as Ursula Poe
 The Second Time Around (1961) as Rena Mitchell
 Run for Your Wife (1965) as Jenny
 Dingaka (1965) as Marion Davis
 Who Killed Teddy Bear? (1965) as Norah Dain 
 Spree (1967) as herself (documentary)

Television
 Adventures in Paradise as Simone (season 2, episode 6 "A Whale of a Tale")
 The Red Skelton Show as Daisy June (season 12, episode 2 in 1962)
 Burke's Law as Angel Crown /(2 episodes, 1963–1964)
 The Dean Martin Show (3 February 1966, and 14 September 1967)
 Mona McCluskey as Mona Carroll McCluskey (1965–1966)
 The Danny Thomas Hour as Aphrodite (1 episode, 1967)
 The Name of the Game as Aja Fowler (1 episode, 1968)
 The Carol Burnett Show in London (1970) (TV) as guest performer
 Second Chance (1972) as Martha Foster
 Tattletales as herself
 The Muppet Show as herself (1 episode, 1976)
 Match Game 77 as herself (5 episodes, 1977)
 Musical Comedy Tonight II (1981) (TV)
 The Love Boat as Samantha Bricker (3 episodes, 1979–1984), as Faye Marsh (episode 65 and 66, 1984)
 Fantasy Island (1 episode, 1983)
 Glitter (1984) (TV)
 Murder, She Wrote as Valerie Bechet (1 episode, 1987)

Stage work
Kismet  (1955)
Eddie Fisher at the Winter Garden (1962) 
Irma La Douce 1963, 1966 (Houston Music Theater), 1968
The Boy Friend (1966) 
Sweet Charity (1967; 1971)
Mame (1969; 1990; 1994)
Damn Yankees (1972) 
The Pajama Game (1973) 
I Do! I Do! (1976)
Funny Girl (1984) 
Follies (1987; 1988; 1990)
Chicago (1992) 
Sugar Babies (1995)

See also
 List of dancers

References

External links

 
 
 
 Time/Life photos of Juliet Prowse

1936 births
1996 deaths
American female dancers
Dancers from California
American film actresses
American musical theatre actresses
American television actresses
Deaths from cancer in California
Deaths from pancreatic cancer
Actresses from Mumbai
Actresses from Los Angeles
South African actresses
South African female dancers
South African emigrants to the United States
South African people of English descent
Anglo-Indian people
20th-century American actresses
20th-century American singers
20th-century American women singers
20th-century American dancers